Håkon Løken (9 November 1859 – 10 September 1923) was a Norwegian jurist, journalist, newspaper editor and non-fiction writer. He was a journalist for the newspaper Dagsposten from 1890 to 1902. He founded the newspaper Nidaros in 1902, and was its chief editor from 1902 to 1910. From 1910 to 1918 he served as a public prosecutor.

References

1859 births
1923 deaths
People from Inderøy
Liberal Party (Norway) politicians
Norwegian newspaper editors